Moeyaert is a surname. Notable persons with the surname include:

 Bart Moeyaert (born 1964), Belgian writer
 Claes Corneliszoon Moeyaert (1592–1655), Catholic Dutch painter

Dutch-language surnames